The 1921 Bewdley by-election was held on 19 April 1921.  The by-election was held due to the incumbent Coalition Conservative MP, Stanley Baldwin, being appointed President of the Board of Trade.  It was retained by Baldwin.

References

1921 elections in the United Kingdom
1921 in England
20th century in Worcestershire
By-elections to the Parliament of the United Kingdom in Worcestershire constituencies
Ministerial by-elections to the Parliament of the United Kingdom
Bewdley
April 1921 events